Musca osiris is a species of fly in the genus Musca. It and Musca vitripennis are the only two species of Musca native to the Palearctic realm, according to Willi Hennig.

References

Muscidae
Diptera of Europe
Insects described in 1830